The Staunton–Waynesboro Metropolitan Statistical Area is a United States Metropolitan Statistical Area (MSA) in Virginia, as defined by the Office of Management and Budget (OMB). As of the 2020 census, the MSA had a population of 125,433.

Components
Note: Since a state constitutional change in 1871, all cities in Virginia are independent cities that are not located in any county. The OMB considers these independent cities to be county-equivalents for the purpose of defining μSAs in Virginia.

One county and two independent cities are included in the Staunton–Waynesboro Metropolitan Statistical Area.

Counties
Augusta
Independent Cities
Staunton
Waynesboro

Communities

Cities
Staunton (Principal city)
Waynesboro (Principal city)

Towns
Craigsville
Grottoes (partial)

Census-designated places
Crimora
Dooms
Fishersville
Greenville
Jolivue
Lyndhurst
Sherando
Stuarts Draft
Verona
Weyers Cave

Unincorporated places
Churchville
Fort Defiance
Mount Solon
Spring Hill

Demographics
As of the census of 2010, there were 118,502 people, 47,899 households, and 32,370 families residing within the μSA. The racial makeup of the μSA was 89.4% White, 6.8% African American, 0.2% Native American, 0.6% Asian, 0.1% Pacific Islander, 1.1% from other races, and 1.8% from two or more races. Hispanic or Latino of any race were 2.8% of the population.

The median income for a household in the MSA was $46,292 and the median income for a family was $58,975. Males had a median income of $40,636 versus $31,670 for females. The per capita income for the USA was $21,577.

See also
Virginia census statistical areas

References

 
Staunton, Virginia
Waynesboro, Virginia
Augusta County, Virginia